Lacanobia softa is a species of moth of the  family Noctuidae. It is found in Algeria, Morocco, Israel and Jordan.

Adults are on wing from October through winter to May. There are two generations per year.

External links
 Hadeninae of Israel

Lacanobia
Moths of the Middle East
Moths described in 1898